Nitram is a 2021 Australian biographical psychological drama film directed by Justin Kurzel from a screenplay by Shaun Grant. The film revolves around the life and behaviors of a mentally distressed young man called "Nitram" (based on Martin Bryant), and the events leading to his involvement in the 1996 Port Arthur massacre in Tasmania, Australia. The film stars Caleb Landry Jones, Judy Davis, Essie Davis and Anthony LaPaglia.

Nitram premiered at the Cannes Film Festival on 16 July 2021, where Jones won the Best Actor award for his performance. The film received a limited theatrical release in Australia on 30 September 2021, before a digital release on the Australian streaming service Stan on 24 November 2021. It received widespread critical acclaim for Kurzel's direction and the cast's performances (particularly Jones and Judy Davis), although the film sparked controversy in Tasmania. The film later received eight awards at the 2021 AACTA Awards, including Best Film, Best Direction, Best Actor, Best Actress, Best Supporting Actor and Best Supporting Actress.

Plot 
Nitram is an intellectually disabled young adult who lives with his parents in Port Arthur, Australia. He regularly sets off fireworks, which upsets the neighbours, and sells his fireworks to local schoolchildren. His father has recently been approved for a business loan, with which he hopes to buy a bed and breakfast that Nitram will help run. Nitram begs his mother to buy him a surfboard after seeing an attractive woman with a surfer, but his exasperated mother refuses.

Nitram tries mowing lawns to make money. In the process, he meets a neighbour named Helen, a retired actress and wealthy heiress, who offers to pay him to walk her dogs. The two quickly become friends, and Helen buys him a car, despite Nitram’s lack of a driver's license and his dangerous habit of lunging for the steering wheel when the two are driving.

Nitram becomes increasingly frustrated with life at home and tells his parents he is moving in with Helen, who permits him to stay in one of her spare rooms but insists that he get rid of his air rifle, as the gun upsets her. At his next birthday, Nitram introduces Helen to his parents; his mother tells Helen an anecdote about a young Nitram taking pleasure in the pain he caused her after pretending to be lost.

Despite having the funds for the bed and breakfast, Nitram's father is denied the purchase when another couple makes a higher offer, and he becomes despondent. Nitram asks Helen if the two can visit New York City, but on the drive to the airport he once again lunges for the steering wheel, resulting in a devastating car crash that kills Helen and severely injures Nitram. When questioned by police about the accident, Nitram lies to the detectives claiming he was asleep at the time of the crash.

Nitram, having inherited Helen's decaying mansion and over half a million dollars, starts to drink heavily. His mother asks him to help his father, who is severely depressed. Nitram then desperately attempts to buy the bed and breakfast with Helen's money, but the couple flatly refuses his offer. Several days later, his father's body is found in a nearby river after an apparent suicide. Nitram's mother refuses to let him attend his father’s funeral, fearing he will embarrass her. The increasingly isolated Nitram begins to take frequent overseas vacations by himself and practices shooting with his air rifle.

While watching the news one night, Nitram sees a report about the Dunblane massacre. He then becomes obsessed with guns, purchasing an unlicensed Colt AR-15 and shotgun from a local gun shop and ordering a handgun. One day, he drives to the café where Helen and his parents celebrated his birthday. After ordering food, he sets up a video camera, retrieves one of his rifles from his sports bag and opens fire on the tourists. At her home, Nitram's mother smokes as the news report of the massacre plays in the background.

Cast
 Caleb Landry Jones as "Nitram" (based on Martin Bryant; "Nitram" is "Martin" spelt backwards)
 Judy Davis as Nitram's mother (based on Carleen Bryant)
 Essie Davis as Helen (based on Helen Mary Elizabeth Harvey)
 Anthony LaPaglia as Nitram’s father (based on Maurice Bryant)
 Sean Keenan as Jamie
 Rick James as the gun shop owner

Production
On 17 November 2020, it was announced that Justin Kurzel would direct a film focused on the 1996 Port Arthur massacre in Tasmania, Australia, starring Caleb Landry Jones, Judy Davis, Essie Davis and Anthony LaPaglia. Principal photography of the film began on 23 January 2021 and concluded on 13 March 2021 in Geelong, Victoria, Australia.

Release 
The film had its premiere at the Cannes Film Festival on 16 July 2021. It was scheduled to screen in mid-August at the later-cancelled Melbourne International Film Festival and later screened at CinefestOZ in Western Australia in late August 2021.

It received a limited theatrical release in Australia by Madman Films on 30 September 2021. It was later released digitally on the Australian streaming service Stan on 24 November 2021.

Reception
On the review aggregator website Rotten Tomatoes, Nitram holds a 93% approval rating based on 114 reviews, with an average rating of 7.9/10. The website's consensus reads, "Nitram asks viewers to face a gut-wrenchingly grim moment in Australian history—but rewards that effort with a gripping, well-acted character study." On Metacritic, the film has a score of 81 out of 100 based on reviews from 26 critics, indicating "universal acclaim".

Reception in Tasmania
The film was met by widespread controversy within Tasmania itself. Kelly Spaulding, Mayor of the Tasman Council, which includes Port Arthur, condemned the choice to make the film. The Alannah and Madeline Foundation, established by the father of two young girls killed in the Port Arthur shooting, released a statement also condemning the choice to produce the film. The Police Association of Tasmania, the union for Tasmania Police, indicated it was worried how members of the union's mental health would be impacted. The Star Theatre, Launceston and the State Cinema, Hobart, were the only cinemas in Tasmania to show the film. However, the State Cinema chose not to advertise the screenings.

The production company invited Arts Minister Elise Archer to meet, but she declined. Screen Tasmania declined to fund the film. The then-Premier of Tasmania, Peter Gutwein, stated to the House of Assembly that it made him uncomfortable. Other state politicians including Brian Mitchell, federal member for Lyons, and Rebecca White, Leader of the Opposition, expressed concern.

Accolades

References

External links
 Nitram page on Madman Films website
 
 
 
 

2021 films
2020s biographical films
2020s psychological drama films
Australian biographical films
Australian psychological drama films
Films about massacres
Films about mass murder
Films about murderers
Films directed by Justin Kurzel
Films set in Tasmania
Films shot in Australia
Port Arthur massacre
Film controversies in Australia
Stan (service) original films
2020s English-language films